The following list includes settlements, geographic features, and political subdivisions of Connecticut whose names are derived from Native American languages.

Listings

State
 Connecticut – from some Eastern Algonquian language of southern New England (perhaps Mahican), meaning "at the long tidal river" (after the Connecticut River).

Settlements

 Aspetuck: (Paugussett) "at the high place"
 Shared with the Aspetuck River.
 Cos Cob: (Mohegan from Cassacubque) "high rocks"
 Hockanum: (Podunk)  "hook"
 Shared with the Hockanum River.
 Massapeag: (Mohegan) "place at the large cove"
 Mohegan: named after the Mohegan people.
 Mianus River (and town): (Paugussett) a 17th-century chief's name – "Mianu/Mayanno's"
 Moodus): (Wangunk) from "mache moodus" or "bad noises"
 Shared with the Moodus River and Moodus Reservoir.
 Moosup: (Narragansett) a chief named "Mausup"
 Mystic River (and town): (Pequot-Mohegan) "great tidal river"
 Naugatuck River (and town): (Quinnipiac) "single tree"
 Niantic River (and town): tribe; "point of land on tidal river"
 Norwalk River (and city): (Algonquian) noyank or "point of land" or from the name Naramauk.
 Oronoque: (Quinnipiac) "curved place" or "land at the bend"
 Pequabuck: (Wangunk) "clear, open pond"
 Poquonock Bridge: (Algonquian – several) "cleared land"
 Shared with the Poquonock River.
 Poquetanuck: (Mohegan) "land broken up" (like dried mud cracking)
 Quinebaug: (Nipmuck) "long pond"
 Shared with the Quinebaug River.
 Scitico: (Nipmuck) "land at the river branch"
 Taconic: (Mahican) "steep ascent"
 Uncasville: (Mohegan) 17th-century chief's name (wonkus – "fox")
 Willimantic River (and town): (Mohegan or Nipmuck) "good cedar swamp"
 Yantic: (Mohegan) "as far as the tide goes up this side of the river".
 Shared with the Yantic River.

Bodies of water

 Congamuck Ponds (on Maine border Congamond Lake): (Nipmuck) "long fishing place"
 Coginchaug River: (Wangunk) "place where fish are dried/cured"
 Housatonic River: (Mahican) from the Mohican phrase "usi-a-di-en-uk", "beyond the mountain"
 Mashapaug Pond: (Nipmuck) "large pond"
 Menunketesuck River (and Menunketesuck Island): (Hammonasset) "strong flowing stream"
 Natchaug River: (Nipmuck) "between rivers"
 Nepaug Reservoir: (Wangunk) "fresh pond"
 Pachaug River (and pond): (Narragansett) "at the turning place"
 Pataguanset Lake: (Niantic) "at the round, shallow place"
 Pawcatuck River (Rhode Island border): (Niantic/Pequot) "the clear divided (tidal) stream"
 Pistapaug Pond: (Quinnipiac) "muddy pond"
 Pocotopaug Lake: (Wangunk) "divided pond" or "two ponds"
 Quaddick Reservoir: (Nipmuck) "bend in river" or (Narragansett) "boggy place"
 Lake Quassapaug: (Quinnipiac) "big pond" or "big rock"
 Quinnipiac River: (Quinnipiac) "where we change our route"
 Lake Quonnipaug: (Quinnipiac) "long pond"
 Saugatuck River: (Paugussett) "outlet of the tidal river"
 Shenipsit Lake: (Mohegan) "at the great pool"
 Shepaug River: (Tunxis) "great pond"
 Shetucket River: (Mohegan) "land between rivers"
 Shunock River: (Mohegan) "stony place" or possibly "place between streams"
 Skungamug River: (Nipmuck) "eel-fishing place"
 Wangum Lake: (Paugussett) "bend/crooked"
 Wangumbaug Lake: (Nipmuck) "crooked pond"
 Lake Waramaug: (Mahican) "good fishing-place"
 Winnepauk: (Mahican) "beautiful pond"
 Wononpacook Pond: (Mahican) "land at the bend in the pond"
 Wononskopomuc Lake: (Mahican) "rocks at the bend in the lake"
 Wopowaug River: (Wangunk) "crossing-place" 
 Wyassup Lake: (Mohegan) "flags" or "rushes"

Islands
 Cockenoe Island: (Montauk) from the name of a 17th-century native interpreter

Other
 Connecticut, the state, and river: (in several dialects) "place of the long river" or "by the long tidal stream"
 Hammonassett Point: (Hammonassett) "place of sand bars"“where we dig holes in the ground,”
 Mohawk Mountain: eastern Iroquois tribe; Algonquian term for their western enemies – "wolves," "hungry animals," or "cannibals"
 Sachem Head: (Algonquian/general) "chief"

See also
List of place names in the United States of Native American origin

References

Citations

Sources

 Bright, William (2004). Native American Placenames of the United States. Norman: University of Oklahoma Press. .
 Campbell, Lyle (1997). American Indian Languages: The Historical Linguistics of Native America. Oxford: Oxford University Press. 

 
 
Connecticut geography-related lists